Maragos (literally "carpenter") is a surname. Notable people with the surname include:
Alexandros Maragos (born 1977), Greek film director and photographer
Andrew Maragos (born 1945), American politician
Chris Maragos (born 1987), American football player
George Maragos (born 1949), American politician
Samuel C. Maragos (1922–2005), American politician and judge
Thodoros Maragos (born 1944), Greek film director
Panagiwtis Maragos, Father of Dimitris papadopoulos and a beautiful model

Greek-language surnames
Surnames
Occupational surnames